Greta "Greet" Mettina Hellemans (born 25 May 1959 in Groningen) is a former rower from the Netherlands, who won the silver medal in the Women's Double Sculls at the 1984 Summer Olympics in Los Angeles, California, partnering with her sister Nicolette.

At the same tournament Hellemans at her second Olympic appearance was also a member of the bronze winning team in the Women's Eights, alongside Marieke van Drogenbroek, Lynda Cornet, Harriet van Ettekoven, Nicolette Hellemans, Martha Laurijsen, Catharina Neelissen, Anne Quist, and Wiljon Vaandrager.

References
 Dutch Olympic Committee

1959 births
Living people
Dutch female rowers
Olympic rowers of the Netherlands
Rowers at the 1980 Summer Olympics
Rowers at the 1984 Summer Olympics
Olympic silver medalists for the Netherlands
Olympic bronze medalists for the Netherlands
Olympic medalists in rowing
Sportspeople from Groningen (city)
Medalists at the 1984 Summer Olympics
20th-century Dutch women
21st-century Dutch women